Alexander Mauricio Madrigal Ureña (born 6 May 1972) is a former Costa Rican-Mexican footballer.

Club career
Madrigal grew up in Santa María de Dota and started his career at Cartaginés, with whom he lost the 1992–93 league title decider against Herediano and the 1995–96 final against Alajuelense, and later joined Alajuelense before entering a 5-year spell in Mexico, where he played for 5 different clubs.

Madrigal also played for Municipal Pérez Zeledón. El Machón finished his career at Guatemalan side Cobán Imperial.

International career
Madrigal made his debut for Costa Rica in a May 1995 friendly match against the USA and earned a total of 34 caps, scoring 2 goals. He represented his country in 12 FIFA World Cup qualification matches  and played at the 1995 UNCAF Nations Cup and was selected for the Costa Rica national football team for the 1998 CONCACAF Gold Cup.

His final international was an April 2002 friendly match against South Korea.

International goals
Scores and results list Costa Rica's goal tally first.

References

External links

 

1972 births
Living people
People from San José Province
Costa Rican emigrants to Mexico
Association football defenders
Costa Rican footballers
Costa Rica international footballers
1998 CONCACAF Gold Cup players
2001 UNCAF Nations Cup players
C.S. Cartaginés players
L.D. Alajuelense footballers
Club León footballers
C.D. Veracruz footballers
Dorados de Sinaloa footballers
Puntarenas F.C. players
Municipal Pérez Zeledón footballers
Cobán Imperial players
Costa Rican expatriate footballers
Expatriate footballers in Mexico
Expatriate footballers in Guatemala
Liga FPD players